Riesel Independent School District is a public school district based in Riesel, Texas (USA). Located in McLennan County, a small portion of the district extends into Falls County. In 2009, the school district was rated "recognized" by the Texas Education Agency.

Schools
Riesel High School (Grades 7–12)
Foster Elementary (Grades PK–6)

Bond
In May 2010, voters approved a $25 million bond for the district and the school is currently preparing to construct a new two-floor high school, add onto its elementary school, relocate and reconstruct a baseball field, and add another softball field, and more.

The school would approve a schematic design in the 2010 school year. New athletic facilities would include 110-seat baseball and softball fields, a new 150-seat gymnasium for the elementary school, and a 954-seat gymnasium for the high school. Improvements would also be done to the football field, including expanding the home bleachers to 1,280 seats.

References

External links
Riesel ISD

School districts in McLennan County, Texas
School districts in Falls County, Texas